Rewaconodon is an extinct genus of dromatheriid cynodonts which existed in India during the upper Triassic period. It is known from two species: R. tikiensis and R. indicus, both of which were found in the Tiki Formation. Other, undescribed species may have lived in North America.

References

Prehistoric prozostrodonts
Prehistoric cynodont genera
Triassic synapsids of Asia
Late Triassic synapsids
Triassic synapsids of North America
Fossil taxa described in 2004